Herbert John Ryser (July 28, 1923 – July 12, 1985) was a professor of mathematics, widely regarded as one of the major figures in combinatorics in the 20th century. He is the namesake of the Bruck–Ryser–Chowla theorem, Ryser's formula for the computation of the permanent of a matrix, and Ryser's conjecture.

Early life
Ryser was born to the family of Fred G. and Edna (Huels) Ryser. He received the B.A. (1945), M.A. (1947), and Ph.D. (1948) from the University of Wisconsin. His doctoral thesis "Rational Vector Spaces" was supervised by Cornelius Joseph Everett, Jr. and Cyrus C. MacDuffee.  (Ryser was Everett's only doctoral student.)

Career
After his Ph.D., Ryser spent a year at Princeton's Institute for Advanced Study, then joined the faculty of Ohio State University. In 1962 he took a professorship at Syracuse University, and in 1967 moved to Caltech. His doctoral students include Richard A. Brualdi, Clement W. H. Lam, and Marion Tinsley.

Ryser contributed to the theory of combinatorial designs, finite set systems, the permanent, combinatorial functions, and to many other topics in combinatorics. He served as editor of the journals Journal of Combinatorial Theory, Linear and Multilinear Algebra, and Journal of Algebra. Ryser's estate funded an endowment creating undergraduate mathematics scholarships at Caltech known as the H. J. Ryser Scholarships.

The Journal of Combinatorial Theory, Series A denoted two issues after Ryser's passing as the "Herbert J. Ryser Memorial Issue", parts 1 and 2.

Books
Combinatorial Mathematics (1963), #14 of the Carus Mathematical Monographs, published by the Mathematical Association of America.  .  Republished and translated into several languages.

Selected papers

References

1923 births
1985 deaths
20th-century American mathematicians
University of Wisconsin–Madison alumni
California Institute of Technology faculty
Ohio State University faculty
Combinatorialists